The Proxmire Amendments were a series of legislation that prohibits the Food and Drug Administration from monitoring and limiting the potency of vitamins and minerals found in dietary supplements. The Proxmire Amendment also made it so that food supplements could not be classified as drugs, making their sale possible without a prescription from a doctor. According to a study done, "dietary supplements fall into the following categories: vitamins, minerals, herbs or other botanicals, amino acids, animal-derived products, hormones and hormone analogs, enzymes, and concentrates, metabolites, constituents, or extracts of these." They can be used by anyone wishing to purchase them as much or as little as they desire. Dietary supplements can be used to increase productivity, treating illness, helping mental health such as depression and anxiety, enhancing mental abilities, building muscle, or losing weight, among many other uses. William Proxmire, a Senator for Wisconsin, was instrumental in influencing the passing the Proxmire Amendment. The Proxmire Amendment is also known as The Rogers-Proxmire Amendment of 1976, and The Vitamins and Minerals Amendments. This amendment became section 411 of the Federal Food, Drug, and Cosmetic Act.

Supplement Definition and Background 
Dietary supplements are vitamins, minerals, proteins, herbs, enzymes and fish oils that people can consume in order to ensure that their body gets enough nutrients to be healthy. They are often used as replacements or even alternative treatments for illness. Because of the ingredients in some dietary supplements, they may be classified as food. This is because these supplements are used for adding taste, aromatic purposes, or adding nutrition to other food. As a result of them being classified as food, they do not require Food and Drug Administration approval before being sold on the market. Plants and herbs were used even in ancient times as medicines. After the popularization of patent medicines in the 1800’s and the demand became greater, more false claims and companies started to emerge with “medications” with secret ingredients not released to the public. The false information continues with the false advertising of the effect and purpose of dietary supplements. The public were and, in some cases, still are ignorant to the dangers and potentially harmful effects of mega dosing or over-consuming specific vitamins and minerals. A lot of confusion stems from the fact that dietary and vitamin supplements are not considered drugs, but they are also not considered food thus exempting them from regulation and approval from the Food and Drug Association. There are some cases when taking supplements may be necessary for health reasons. An example of this may be during pregnancy, or when a person is experiencing a severe deficiency of a specific vitamin or mineral. Before consuming  dietary supplements however, one should always consult their doctor to ensure safe use and affects. When supplements are taken unnecessarily or in large amounts it can result in toxic reactions, sickness, and in some cases death. Many people are unaware of the potential dangers of dietary supplements because they are often marketed as harmless and helpful.

History 
The dietary supplement industry has accused the Food and Drug Administration of regulatory bias. In 1976, the Food and Drug Administration attempted to restrict the purchase and contents of dietary supplements. The Food and Drug Administration attempted to use evidence that said certain nutrients could be unhealthy if taken in unregulated amounts, but American citizens rebutted with a campaign based largely around letter-writing. The campaign resulted in the Food and Drug Administration's attempted restrictions being withdrawn. The legislation that made it so that the Food and Drug Administration can not require a prescription from a doctor to buy supplements and also that the contents of supplements cannot be government regulated.

Public Opinion 
As of 1994, not quite half of Americans took dietary supplements regularly. J.B. Cordaro, president of the Council for Responsible Nutrition said about the Proxmire Amendment, "Rogers-Proxmire meant the survival of our industry... Without that, the Food and Drug Administration...could have crippled us." Public opinion was that Food and Drug Administration restriction on the supplement industry would have inhibited American citizen's rights to their personal healthcare. Some dieticians warn of the dangers of unregulated supplements, saying that they are misleading and are actually not as useful as they are marketed to be.

Lasting Effects 
The Proxmire Amendment outlawed the Food and Drug Administration from regulating potency of vitamin and mineral supplements. The mineral and vitamin supplements industry continued to grow in the '80s as did the reports of illnesses and deaths due to the overconsumption of specific vitamins, minerals, and supplements. Because of the passing of the Proxmire amendment and Dietary Supplement Health and Education Act, the dietary supplement industry has had a large increase in revenue and sales, around $30 billion. Back in 2015 they had more than 85,000 products selling in stores that didn’t help improve health in any way. Manufacturers of dietary supplements don’t have to give the full background and overall safety information to the Food and Drug Administration before releasing the products. The Food and Drug Administration has no other choice than to try to determine the health risks and benefits of products from the information companies release to the public, and the experiments they can hold in their own laboratories. As part of the Proxmire Amendment, the Food and Drug Administration does not schedule routine inspections of companies that produce dietary supplements. Instead, the Food and Drug Administration waits until a consumer files a complaint and then they oversee an investigation into that specific supplement's risks.

From the 1960s to present, the Food and Drug Administration's relationship with American consumers has changed drastically. In the 1960s, there were not as many options and opinions regarding things such as food, medicine, hygiene products, among other things that were available to purchase in stores. The Food and Drug Administration used to see the consumer as a passive and relatively uninformed about their purchases. It was common for them to trust what they read without doing any research. This made it necessary to put regulations in place for many things, including dietary supplements. Flash forward to the present day and age we are in, and consumers are much more likely to do their research before they buy something such as dietary and mineral supplements. This holds companies more accountable and significantly diminishes the need for regulation of certain items.

Current Legislation 

After the 1976 Proxmire Amendment was put in place, the Food and Drug Administration continued to fight for the regulation of minerals and dietary supplements. In 1993, an attempt was made to lay more restrictions and rules on dietary supplements under another name. The Food and Drug Administration attempted to call them unapproved food additives and drugs in the hopes that they would then be able to regulate them in supplements. However, the public and the media were not receptive to this new labeling of supplements. In response to the push back from the public, the government put the Dietary Supplement Health and Education Act in place. The Dietary Supplement Health and Education Act provided more regulations on dietary supplements, therefore, further limiting the Food and Drug Administration’s ability to regulate the ingredients and risks of these products. The Dietary Supplement Health and Education Act required supplements that contained new ingredients to be marked so that consumers were aware. Manufacturers were required to give the Food and Drug Administration the background of why new ingredients they were adding were deemed safe for public use. The companies, however, could still promote their product before giving the Food and Drug Administration that information. The Dietary Supplement Health and Education Act made it easier for companies, such as J.R. Carlson's Laboratories, to better educate their consumers as they considered buying their products in an effort to increase their personal health. The Proxmire Amendments made it so that the Food and Drug Administration was unable to regulate the contents of supplements, but the Dietary Supplement Health and Education Act modified that and provided guidelines for labeling. However, if a dietary supplement makes a claim to have the same benefits as a drug, it is required to be verified and go through the same process as a drug to gain market approval. The Food and Drug Administration considers moderate amounts of vitamins and minerals to be generally safe without premarket approval. It is important to note that the information put on the safety labels is not the only thing that the Food and Drug Administration needs to consider. The different composition and quality of products can be more detrimental to health and is more important to note, in some cases, than the inherent safety of a product. The Food and Drug Administration is restricted from that information, however, and can not be entirely sure of the composition of certain products. In summary, the Proxmire Amendment and Dietary Supplement Health and Education Act are still in place, therefore, the Food and Drug Administration's ability to regulate dietary and mineral supplements is minimal and restricted.

References

United States federal legislation